Xanthan ketal pyruvate transferase (KPT) is an enzyme with systematic name phosphoenolpyruvate:D-Man-beta-(1->4)-GlcA-beta-(1->2)-D-Man-alpha-(1->3)-D-Glc-beta-(1->4)-D-Glc-alpha-1-diphospho-ditrans,octacis-undecaprenol 4,6-O-(1-carboxyethan-1,1-diyl)transferase. This enzyme catalyses the following chemical reaction

 phosphoenolpyruvate + D-Man-beta-(1->4)-D-GlcA-beta-(1->2)-D-Man-alpha-(1->3)-D-Glc-beta-(1->4)-D-Glc-alpha-1-diphospho-ditrans,octacis-undecaprenol   + phosphate

This enzyme is involved in the biosynthesis of the polysaccharide xanthan.

References

External links 

EC 2.5.1